Dan Halperin from Tel Aviv University was named Fellow of the Institute of Electrical and Electronics Engineers (IEEE) in 2015 for contributions to robust geometric algorithms for robotics and automation.
Halperin was elected as an ACM Fellow in 2018 for "contributions to robust geometric computing and applications to robotics and automation".

References 

Academic staff of Tel Aviv University
Researchers in geometric algorithms
Fellow Members of the IEEE
Fellows of the Association for Computing Machinery
Living people
Year of birth missing (living people)